Nocardioides lianchengensis is a Gram-positive, aerobic and rod-shaped bacterium from the genus Nocardioides which has been isolated from soil from Liancheng County, China.

References

External links
Type strain of Nocardioides lianchengensis at BacDive -  the Bacterial Diversity Metadatabase	

lianchengensis
Bacteria described in 2012